Gamesmaster may refer to:

GamesMaster, a British television show that ran from 1992 to 1998, dedicated to video games, revived in 2021
"The Gamesmaster", an episode of season one of G.I.Joe : A Real American Hero
GamesMaster (magazine), a spinoff of the above television show
Gamesmaster (comics), a character in the Marvel Universe
GamesMaster International, a magazine dedicated to roleplaying games
"The Gamesmaster", stage name for American professional wrestler Kevin Sullivan (born 1949)

See also
Gamemaster (disambiguation)